Ismāʿīl ibn Ṣāliḥ ibn ʿAlī al-Hāshimī was an eighth century Abbasid governor of Egypt and Aleppo.

A member of the Abbasid family, he was a son of Salih ibn Ali and a first cousin of the first two Abbasid caliphs al-Saffah and al-Mansur. During the reign of Harun al-Rashid he was appointed as governor of Egypt in 797. After an administration lasting slightly less than a year, he was dismissed from that province and instead posted to Aleppo and Qinnasrin, which he proceeded to hold for an unspecified length of time.

Notes

References
 
 
 
 
 

Abbasid governors of Egypt
Abbasids
8th-century Abbasid governors of Egypt
8th-century Arabs